The 2020–21 season was the 12th and final professional football season in Viitorul Constanța's existence, and the ninth in the top-flight of Romanian football. Viitorul competed in Liga I and in the Cupa României.

Previous season positions

Season overview

July

On 6 July 2020 Cosmin Dur-Bozoancă returned from loan at Universitatea Cluj. Cosmin was one of the main players at  Universitatea Cluj and ASU Politehnica Timișoara, where he played  88 games. He was also called up at the Romania national under-21 football team for the 2021 UEFA European Under-21 Championship qualification Group 8 match against Denmark national under-21 football team.

George Ganea, Virgil Ghiță, Andrei Ciobanu and Carlo Casap  were called up to the Romania national under-21 football team for a friendly match against FC Farul Constanța held at Mogoșoaia, on 6 August.

On 31 July 2020 the club announced that they signed the Spanish player Victor Fernández Satue.

August
On 6 August 2020 George Ganea scored two goals for Romania national under-21 football team in a friendly match against FC Farul Constanța. Virgil Ghiță, Andrei Ciobanu, and Carlo Casap were in the first XI.

On 7 August 2020 FC Viitorul Constanța appointed Rubén Alfonso de la Barrera Fernández as the new team manager and Francisco Ruiz Beltrán, Pere Romeu Sunyer, and Iván Peñaranda Llauradó as assistant managers. They were presented in a press conference alongside the club president, Gheorghe Popescu and sporting director, Zoltán Iasko.

On 10 August 2020 Rubén Alfonso de la Barrera Fernández led the first training session at FC Viitorul Constanța. On the same day, Alexandru Mățan and Valentin Cojocaru returned from the loan at FC Voluntari.

On 12 August 2020 FC Viitorul Constanța and KS Cracovia agreed to transfer Rivaldinho to the Polish club for a fee of  €300,000.

On 17 August 2020 Louis Munteanu presented the team's new official logo and Nike home kit for the next season. That day, FC Viitorul Constanța announced that they signed the Spanish player Ángel Martínez who had played for Asteras Tripolis. FC Viitorul Constanța appointed Jarkko Tuomisto as the new Goalkeeping Coach for the team. As Goalkeeping Coach he led CSD Independiente del Valle to the title of the 2019 Copa Sudamericana.

On 18 August 2020 FC Viitorul Constanța announced that Vlad Achim's contract had expired and that he was being released. FC Dinamo București later announced that they signed Achim.

On 22 August 2020 the club announced that they signed the Dutch–Ghanaian player Kevin Luckassen.

On 23 August 2020 Viitorul drew 1–1 against UTA Arad at home. Gabriel Iancu scored a goal.

On 24 August 2020 the Gheorghe Hagi Football Academy and FC Viitorul Constanța signed a partnership with ACS Victoria Delta Tulcea.

On 25 August 2020 Louis Munteanu, Alexi Pitu, Darius Grosu and Constantin Grameni were called up to the Romania national under-19 football team for a friendly match against FC Voluntari held at Buftea, on 7 September.

On 27 August 2020 the Gheorghe Hagi Football Academy and FC Viitorul Constanța signed a partnership with CS Medgidia. That day the club also announced that they signed the player Alin Dobrosavlevici.

Gabriel Iancu was called up to the Romania national football team for the 2020–21 UEFA Nations League games against Northern Ireland and Austria on 4 and 7 September 2020 respectively.

George Ganea, Virgil Ghiță, Andrei Ciobanu, Alexandru Mățan, Radu Boboc and Carlo Casap were called up to the Romania national under-21 football team for the 2021 UEFA European Under-21 Championship qualification Group 8 match against to the Finland national under-21 football team in 4 September 2020 and to the Malta national under-21 football team in 8 September 2020.

On 30 August 2020 the match against FCSB was lost 3-0. On the same day, Viitorul reached an agreement with AFC Chindia Târgoviște to loan Tiberiu Căpușă, Marco Dulca and Paul Iacob for one season.

September
On 1 September 2020 the club announced that they signed the Spanish player Josemi Castañeda.

On 4 September 2020 Andrei Ciobanu scored one goal for the Romania national under-21 football team in the 2021 UEFA European Under-21 Championship qualification Group 8 match against the Finland national under-21 football team. Virgil Ghiță, George Ganea and Radu Boboc were in the first XI. Alexandru Mățan entered as a substitute.

On 5 September 2020 Louis Munteanu scored one goal for the Romania national under-19 football team in a friendly match against FC Voluntari. Darius Grosu was in the first XI. Constantin Grameni and Alexi Pitu entered as substitutes.

On 7 September 2020 Gabriel Iancu entered as substitute for Romania national football team in the UEFA Nations League match against the Austria national football team.

On 8 September 2020 in the 2021 UEFA European Under-21 Championship qualification Group 8 match against the Finland national under-21 football team, Virgil Ghiță and Carlo Casap were in the first XI. Alexandru Mățan and Andrei Ciobanu entered as substitutes.

On 14 September 2020 the match against CS Universitatea Craiova was lost 1-4. Kevin Luckassen scored his first goal for FC Viitorul Constanța.

On 19 September 2020 Viitorul drew 1–1 away against Sepsi OSK Sfântu Gheorghe. Andrei Ciobanu scored for Viitorul.

On 23 September 2020 the club announced that they signed the Spanish player Jon Gaztañaga. Gaztañaga was a product of Real Sociedad's youth system. Gaztañaga was picked by the Spain under-17 team for the 2008 UEFA European Football Championship. He started as a stopper in the final against France, which ended with a 4–0 triumph. On the same day FC Viitorul and Andrei Ciobanu, Radu Boboc, Alexandru Mățan, Carlo Casap and George Ganea reached an agreement to extend the players' contracts for another four seasons through to 2024 and Gabriel Iancu for a further two seasons through to 2022.

Romario Benzar joined FC Viitorul on 24 September on loan until the end of the 2020–21 season. Benzar started playing football in the Gheorghe Hagi Academy and made his debut for fellow team Viitorul Constanța in 2010. He won the Liga I in 2016–17. Benzar plays for the Romania national team. That day FC Viitorul and Ștefan Bodișteanu also reached an agreement to extend the player's contract for a further two seasons through to 2022 and Alexandru Georgescu for a further five seasons through to 2025. Viitorul had reached an agreement with FC Farul Constanța to loan Cosmin Dur-Bozoancă for one season.

On 25 September 2020 FC Viitorul and Damien Dussaut reached an agreement to extend the player's contract for a further two seasons through to 2022 and Cătălin Căbuz for a further three seasons through to 2023.

On 26 September 2020 Viitorul won 4–1 home against Astra Giurgiu. Gabriel Iancu made two goals, Kevin Luckassen and Alexandru Mățan scored for Viitorul. On the same day FC Viitorul Constanța and ACF Fiorentina reached an agreement to transfer Louis Munteanu to the Italian club for a fee of €2,000,000.

On 29 September 2020 the club announced that they signed the Romanian player Adrian Stoian. Stoian was picked by the Romania national football team in 2018.

On 8 September 2020 in the 2021 UEFA European Under-21 Championship qualification Group 8 match against to the Finland national under-21 football team, Virgil Ghiță and Carlo Casap were in the first XI. Alexandru Mățan and Andrei Ciobanu entered as substitutes.

October
On 4 October 2020 Viitorul drew 1–1 away against CFR Cluj. Kevin Luckassen scored for Viitorul. His goal was the 400th goal in Viitorul Constanța's existence in the top-flight of Romanian football.

On 5 October 2020 the club announced that they signed the Cape Verdean player Ely Fernandes.

On 6 October 2020 FC Viitorul and Bradley de Nooijer reached an agreement to extend the player's contract for a further three seasons.

On 8 October 2020 Gabriel Iancu entered as substitute for Romania national football team in the UEFA Euro 2020 Play-Off match against to the Iceland national football team.

On 9 October 2020 in the 2021 UEFA European Under-21 Championship qualification Group 8 match against to the Ukraine national under-21 football team, Virgil Ghiță, Alexandru Mățan and Andrei Ciobanu were in the first XI. Radu Boboc entered as a substitute.

On 11 October 2020 Gabriel Iancu was in the first XI for Romania national football team in the UEFA Nations League match against the Norway national football team.

On 13 October 2020 in the 2021 UEFA European Under-21 Championship qualification Group 8 match against the Malta national under-21 football team, George Ganea, Alexandru Mățan and Andrei Ciobanu  were in the first XI. George Ganea and Alexandru Mățan scored for Romania national under-21 football team.

On 14 October 2020 Gabriel Iancu entered as a substitute for Romania national football team in the UEFA Nations League match against to the Austria national football team.

On 19 October 2020 Viitorul won 2–0 away against FC Voluntari. Kevin Luckassen and Carlo Casap scored for Viitorul.

On 25 October 2020 Viitorul drew 2–2 against FC Argeș Pitești at home. Andrei Ciobanu and Jon Gaztañaga scored for Viitorul.

November
On 1 November 2020 Viitorul won 3–0 away against Politehnica Iași. Alin Dobrosavlevici scored his first goal for Viitorul. The match was awarded to Viitorul because Politehnica's stadium wasn't able to provide the conditions.

On 8 November 2020 won 2–1 home against FC Dinamo București. Alin Dobrosavlevici and Kevin Luckassen scored for Viitorul.

On 17 November 2020 Romania national under-21 football team drew 1–1 against in the 2021 UEFA European Under-21 Championship qualification Group 8 match against to the Denmark national under-21 football team. Alexandru Mățan and Radu Boboc were in the first XI. Carlo Casap was also called.

On 21 November 2020 the match against Academica Clinceni was lost 1-0.

On 28 November 2020 the match against FC Dinamo București was lost 3-0.

On 30 November 2020 the technical staff (Rubén Alfonso de la Barrera Fernández, Francisco Ruiz Beltrán, Pere Romeu Sunyer, Iván Peñaranda Llauradó, Jarkko Tuomisto and Antonio Camacho) was sacked due to poor results.

December
On 1 December 2020 FC Viitorul Constanța appointed Mircea Rednic as the new manager for the team , Alecsandru Popovici and Sorin Rădoi as assistant managers, Ștefan Preda as goalkeeping coach and Andrei Antoce as fitness coach. Mircea Rednic managed teams such as FC Rapid București, FC Dinamo București, Khazar Lankaran FK, KAA Gent, Royal Excel Mouscron and Standard Liège. He last managed Politehnica Iași. Alecsandru Popovici was manager for ARO Câmpulung and assistant manager for FC Viitorul Constanța. Sorin Rădoi is a  former player who played for FC Viitorul Constanța and was assistant manager for FC Viitorul Constanța. Ștefan Preda was goalkeeping coach for FCSB and FC Viitorul Constanța. As goalkeeper Preda got three caps for the national team, and was in the squad for the 1994 World Cup. Andrei Antoce was fitness coach for Politehnica II Iaşi.

On 12 December 2020 Viitorul drew 1–1 away against AFC Chindia Târgoviște. Gabriel Iancu scored for Viitorul.

On 15 December 2020 the match against FC Botoșani was lost 1-2. Kevin Luckassen scored a goal for FC Viitorul Constanța.

On 19 December 2020 the match against Gaz Metan Mediaș was lost 1-0.

January

On 6 January 2021 the club announced that they signed Latvian forward Valērijs Šabala. After loan stints in Poland, the Czech Republic, Slovakia and Latvia, on 4 August 2017 Šabala signed a two-year contract with I liga side Podbeskidzie Bielsko-Biała. He became the top scorer of the 2018–19 I liga season, scoring 12 goals. Šabala was a member of all international youth teams and made his debut for the Latvia national football team on 24 May 2013 in a friendly match against Qatar. In the next match he scored his first goals for the national team, scoring twice in a friendly match against Turkey, becoming the youngest ever international goal scorer for Latvia. His first official qualifier match was the 2014 World Cup qualifying match against Bosnia and Herzegovina.

On 10 January 2021 the club. won 2–1 home against FC Hermannstadt. Kevin Luckassen and Andrei Ciobanu scored for Viitorul.

On 11 January 2021 the club announced that they signed the  Macedonian player David Babunski. Born in Skopje, Babunski joined FC Barcelona's La Masia in 2006, aged 12, after starring at UDA Gramenet.

On 13 January 2021 Gabriel Iancu, captain of FC Viitorul Constanța at the time, signed for the Russian club FC Akhmat Grozny for a reported fee of €500,000.

On 15 January 2021 Viitorul drew 0–0 away against UTA Arad.

On 19 January 2021 the club drew 2–2 against FCSB at home. Cosmin Matei and Ely Fernandes scored for Viitorul.

On 23 January 2021 Viitorul drew 1–1 away against FC Universitatea Craiova. Andrei Artean scored for Viitorul.

On 24 January 2021 the club announced that they signed Răzvan Grădinaru.

On 26 January 2021 the club drew 3–3 against Sepsi OSK Sfântu Gheorghe at home. Andrei Ciobanu and Kevin Luckassen scored for Viitorul.

On 31 January 2021 Viitorul drew 1–1 away against Astra Giurgiu. George Ganea scored for Viitorul.

February
On 1 February 2021 Kevin Luckassen, FC Viitorul Constanța's top goal scorer at the time, signed for the Turkish club Kayserispor for a reported fee of €800,000.

On 4 February, the match against CFR Cluj was lost 2-1. Alin Dobrosavlevici scored for Viitorul.

Artur Crăciun joined FC Viitorul on 6 February 2021 on loan until the end of the 2020–21 season.

On 8 February 2021 the club announced that they signed Jô Santos.

On 8 February 2021 the match against FC Voluntari was lost 0-1.
 
On 12 February 2021  Viitorul had reached an agreement with FC Vorskla Poltava to loan Bradley de Nooijer for one season. In the same day, the match against FC Argeș Pitești was lost 1-0.

On 17 February 2021 Luca Andronache and Ștefan Bodișteanu scored two goals for Romania national under-18 football team in a friendly match against FC Viitorul II Constanța. Luca Andronache scored one goal for Romania national under-18 football team in a friendly match against FCSB U18, too.

On 19 February 2021 the club announced that they signed Juvhel Tsoumou.

On 26 February 2021 FC Viitorul won 5–0 away against FC Dinamo București. Jô Santos, George Ganea, Andrei Ciobanu and Juvhel Tsoumou scored for Viitorul.

March
On 4 March 2021 the club announced that they signed Marquinhos Pedroso.

On 6 March 2021 Viitorul drew 1–1 against Academica Clinceni at home. Juvhel Tsoumou scored for Viitorul.

On 13 March 2021 Viitorul drew 0–0 against FC Hermannstadt.

On 15 March 2021 George Ganea, Radu Boboc and Andrei Ciobanu were called up for the 2021 UEFA European Under-21 Championship from 24 to 30 March 2021.

On 17 March 2021 Viitorul drew 0–0 against AFC Chindia Târgoviște at home.

On 19 March 2021 Juvhel Tsoumou was called by the Congo national football team for the 2021 Africa Cup of Nations qualifiers against Senegal and Guinea-Bissau on 22 and 30 March respectively.

On 24 March 2021 Andrei Ciobanu scored one goal for Romania national under-21 football team in the 2021 UEFA European Under-21 Championship match against Netherlands national under-21 football team. George Ganea and Radu Boboc were in the first XI.

On 26 March 2021 FC Viitorul won 1–0 against FC Argeș Pitești in a friendly match. Luca Andronache scored for Viitorul.

On 27 March 2021 Andrei Ciobanu, George Ganea and Radu Boboc played for Romania national under-21 football team in the 2021 UEFA European Under-21 Championship match against Hungary national under-21 football team.

On 30 March 2021 Andrei Ciobanu and Radu Boboc played for Romania national under-21 football team in the 2021 UEFA European Under-21 Championship  match against Germany national under-21 football team.

April

On 4 April 2021 the club lost the match against FC Botoșani 1-0.

On 8 April 2021 the match against FC Politehnica Iași was lost 1-2.Juvhel Tsoumou scored for Viitorul. In the same day, Mircea Rednic and Andrei Antoce were sacked due to poor results.

On 6 April 2021 FC Viitorul Constanța appointed Cătălin Anghel as the new team manage. He had worked as head coach for CSO Ovidiu, Săgeata Năvodari and Viitorul Constanța.Cristian Sava was appointed as assistant manager and Ștefan Anghel as fitness coach.

On 12 April 2021 the match against Gaz Metan Mediaș was lost 0-2.

On 16 April the club lost the match against UTA Arad 1-0.

On 20 April the club won the match against Gaz Metan Mediaș 1-0. Andrei Ciobanu scored for Viitorul.

On 26 April the club lost the match against FC Voluntari 1-0.

On 29 April Viitorul won 3–0 away against Politehnica Iași. Jô Santos and Andrei Ciobanu scored for Viitorul.

May
On 2 May, Viitorul lost the match against FC Dinamo București. Jô Santos scored for Viitorul.

On 5 May 2021 Viitorul drew 0–0 against FC Hermannstadt.

On 9 May Viitorul won 1–0 home against FC Argeș Pitești. Andrei Artean scored for Viitorul.

On 14 May Viitorul won 2–0 away against AFC Chindia Târgoviște. Jô Santos and Aurelian Chițu scored for Viitorul.

On 19 May Viitorul won 1–0 home against AFC Astra Giurgiu. Aurelian Chițu scored for Viitorul.

On 27 May Viitorul won 3–2 away against AFC Chindia Târgoviște. Andrei Artean, Ely Fernandes and Juvhel Tsoumou scored for Viitorul.

On 30 May, Viitorul lost the match against Sepsi OSK Sfântu Gheorghe.

Club officials

Management

 Last updated: 2020
 Source: Board of directors (Hagi Academy)
 Source: Board of directors (Viitorul)

Current technical staff

 Last updated: 23 May 2021
 Source: 
 Source: Medical staff
 Source: Press release

Players

Current squad

Transfers

In

Out

Loans in

Loans out

Retired players

Friendly matches

Competitions

Liga I

Regular season

Table

Results by round

Matches

Relegation round

Table

Results by round

Matches

European play-offs
In the semi-final, the 7th and 8th-placed teams of the Liga I plays a one-legged match on the ground of the better placed team (7th place). In the final, the winner of the semi-final will encounter the team ranked on the last UEFA Europa Conference League spot in the play-off tournament. The winner of the final will enter the second qualifying round of the UEFA Europa Conference League.

European play-off semi-final

European play-off final

Cupa României

Statistics

Appearances and goals

  

! colspan="13" style="background:#DCDCDC; text-align:center" | Players transferred out during the season
|-

|}

Squad statistics

Goalscorers

Goal minutes

Clean sheets

Disciplinary record

Managerial statistics (2020-21 season)

Injury record

See also
 2020–21 Cupa României
 2020–21 Liga I

References

FC Viitorul Constanța seasons
Viitorul, Constanța, FC